The Re-Invention World Tour (billed as Re-Invention World Tour 2004) was the sixth concert tour by American singer-songwriter Madonna, in support of her ninth studio album American Life (2003). The tour began on May 24, 2004, in Inglewood and ended on September 14 in Lisbon. Additionally, it marked Madonna's first concerts in Portugal and Ireland. Rumors of a concert tour first began circulating on October 2003, but nothing was confirmed until March 2004. According to some, the title Re-Invention was a dig at Madonna's critics who, throughout her career, had talked about her "reinventing herself"; the singer said she chose this name because she wanted to "re-invent" her old material. A number of songs were rehearsed for the tour, with twenty-four making the final setlist. Like past Madonna tours, Re-Invention was divided into different thematic acts: Marie Antoinette, Military, Circus, Acoustic, and Scottish-Tribal; the wardrobe was created by designers Arianne Phillips, Stella McCartney, Christian Lacroix, and Karl Lagerfeld.

Critical reviews ranged from positive to mixed: the singer was praised for performing the "classic" songs from her past ―which had been absent from her previous Drowned World Tour (2001)― but the show's themes and political tones were criticized. Nonetheless, it was awarded Top Tour at the 2004 Billboard Touring Awards. Re-Invention proved to be a commercial success, with total sell-outs and multiple extra dates being added. It became the highest-grossing concert tour of 2004, earning over $125 million from 56 shows, and an audience of over 900,000. Fellow singer Elton John then accused Madonna of lip-synching, which was denied by her representatives and John later apologized. The documentary chronicling the tour, I'm Going to Tell You a Secret, was directed by Jonas Åkerlund and released in 2005.

Background 
In August 2002, Madonna and Steven Klein temed up together for an art installation project titled X-STaTIC PRO=CeSS. Created to "deconstruct" the "cult of Madonna while trading on her star power", it was shot inside "stark" interiors and featured "twitchy" footage of the singer decked out  in "enigmatic" clothing including leotards, corsets, fishnet tights, satin shoes and a dress designed by Jean Paul Gaultier that made her look like a "Byzantine queen". It was first exhibited in New York, on March 27, 2003, before traveling to London, Paris, Düsseldorf, Berlin and ending in Florence on May 3. Madonna's ninth studio album, American Life, was released on April 21. To start marketing the album, she embarked on a promotional tour across the United States and Europe; she performed at the Total Request Live studios in New York, the HMV store on Oxford Street, London, and appeared at BBC One's Friday Night with Jonathan Ross and Top of the Pops. On August 27, she opened the 2003 MTV Video Music Awards with American recording artists Britney Spears and Christina Aguilera, performing a medley of "Like a Virgin" (1984) and album single "Hollywood". During a Q&A with fans through Madonna's official website in October, her manager Caresse Henry said she would "definitely" go on tour, either in summer 2004, or in 2005. In January 2004, the singer herself said she had "ideas for shows in [my] head", and was waiting for the "best time to step into a world tour". That month, the Las Vegas Sun sent out a press release announcing that Madonna would kick off the 32-city US leg of a world tour on June 1 in San Francisco, California, but nothing was confirmed.

In March, Scottish bagpiper Calum Frase, whom Madonna had invited to play at her son Rocco's christening, said he was approached by the singer to join her on a five-month tour, tentatively named Whore of Babylon World Tour 2004; later that month, it was reported by MTV that the singer was "in rehearsals for a summer swing". The Re-Invention World Tour was officially confirmed by Caresse Henry on March 23; "[Madonna] can't wait to get back on stage [...] There is no doubt that this tour will be the pinnacle of her long standing and well deserved reputation as one of the most exciting live performers of our time", the press release read. According to Dirk Timmerman, author of Madonna Live! Secret Re-inventions and Confessions on Tour, working on X-STaTIC PRO=CeSS inspired the singer to come up with the tour.

Her first concert tour in three years, it was set to launch in May and run through August, visiting cities in the United States and Europe. Additionally, it marked Madonna's first visit to Ireland. Concerts in Tel Aviv were scheduled but cancelled, as the singer received death threats from an "unnamed Palestinian group". Madonna told Access Hollywood that her manager said she should not travel to Israel because of the "attack on the leader of Hamas [...] It’s not a good idea to go there and do concerts". Nonetheless, she said that "if I had my way, I’d go". The Re-Invention World Tour officially began in Los Angeles on May 24 and ended in Lisbon on September 14, 2004.

Development 

According to Caresse Henry, one of the "major complaints" fans had regarding 2001's Drowned World Tour was the lack of Madonna's "classic hits", thus, "[she] came to the conclusion that it was time to perform more of her entire repertoire". During an interview with TRL, Madonna explained: "we’re talking old and new [...] I’m going to be doing songs from my entire career, like they’ve never been done before. Because that’s what life is all about". The title Re-Invention was, according to Christianity Magazine, a "self-confident, ambivalent dig at all the people who for years have talked about [Madonna] 'reinventing herself'"; the singer said she chose this name because she wanted to capture "the irony [of my old songs] [...] the only way I could do them was by re-inventing them, approach them from another angle". Described as "much lighter in tone" than Drowned World, its central theme was "unity vs. violence". Henry described it as a "brilliant performance show [...] extravagant, but more in line with how shows used to be and scaled back, but filled with plenty of eye candy". Similar to Madonna's past tours, it was divided into different thematic acts: Marie Antoinette, Military, Circus, Acoustic, and Scottish-Tribal.

Jamie King was once again appointed creative director. Other personnel included Madonna's lifelong backup singer and dancer Donna De Lory, vocalist Siedah Garrett, bagpiper Lorne Cousin, Monte Pittman on guitar, Stuart Price on keyboards, and 12 dancers, including three trapeze artists. Auditions for dancers took place from February to March in New York and Los Angeles's Culver Studios, with rehearsals taking place at the Great Western Forum. Allan Dekko was selected to choreograph the performance of "Express Yourself" (1989), which was given a military theme. Of working with the singer, Dekko recalled that "I won't say that she is a natural, but what is being asked of her she did well [...] I found her pleasant to work with". Five moving video screens - three big ones, the largest of which was 7 tons, and two slightly smaller ones - that were moved by 160 motors formed the backdrop. Equipment also included 130 rigging points, an arsenal of moving lights and four tons worth of Claire Brothers line array sound system; also present was a 22 meter, V-shaped truss catwalk that was lowered from the ceiling above the front of the audience. Props for the show included a half-pipe skateboarding ramp and an electric chair. Images and footage from X-STaTIC PRO=CeSS were used as backdrop videos. 

During rehearsals, a general set list was decided; it featured "Material Girl" (1984),  "Dress You Up" (1985), and "I'm So Stupid" from American Life. However, Madonna  found it difficult to learn the guitar chords for the last two and were removed. Other discarded songs included the Headcleanr Rock mix of "Love Profusion" (2004), "Swim" from Ray of Light (1998), "Take a Bow" (1994), and "Live to Tell" (1986). Originally, "Vogue" (1990) was chosen as the opening number until Madonna decided to use "The Beast Within" instead; also, "Nobody Knows Me" was first rehearsed in its Peter Rauhofer's Perfect Private Life Mix. Initially, Madonna planned to perform "Die Another Day" (2002) as the closing number, but it was replaced with "Holiday" (1983). The John Lennon song "Imagine" (1971) was also added to the set list; when asked why she chose to cover this song, Madonna simply said: "I wanted to make a statement with the ultimate peace song". "Don't Tell Me" (2000) was rehearsed in two versions – one that featured the video of a French skyline as backdrop, used on the American leg and Paris shows, and one that sampled The Verve's "Bitter Sweet Symphony" (1997), used on the remaining concerts of the tour. "Ray of Light" was also rehearsed during the initial phases, but the singer later decided to eliminate it, as performing the song at the beginning of the show would hurt her voice beforehand. At the end, twenty-four of the thirty rehearsed songs made the final set list. According to Dirk Timmerman, two new songs were created for the tour; "The Devil Wouldn't Recognize You", written by Madonna and Joe Henry, and "I Love New York", written by the singer and Stuart Price. The latter was reworked into a dance track for Madonna's tenth studio album, Confessions on a Dance Floor (2005), while the former was included in her eleventh studio album, Hard Candy (2008).

The tour's wardrobe was in charge of Arianne Phillips. When creating the costumes, Phillips recalled that "[Madonna] goes back and revisits older songs and reinvents them, so we used that same philosophy"; the designer confirmed the singer would be making five costume changes throughout the show. Other designers working on the tour included Stella McCartney, Christian Lacroix, and Karl Lagerfeld for Chanel. Lacroix had worked with the singer on X-STaTIC Pro=CeSS and was called back to recreate one of the corsets Madonna had worn on the installation. The result was a Baroque-inspired, champagne-colored crystal-studded corset, used for the opening sequence. The second segment, which was inspired by the American Life album and described by Phillips as "real rock ’n’ roll", featured military-inspired garments. The third act, based on the work of Federico Fellini and carnavals, featured chorus girl-inspired corsets of "strong and graphic [...] sexy and sassy" colors, created by Lagerfield. The fourth act was the "emotional" point of the show, thus the costumes, designed by McCartney, were quieter and focused on displaying the silhouettes of the performers. The finale included mostly kilts, provided by USA Kilts; Phillips decided to merge "hip-hop sensibilities with traditional Scottish elements", something Madonna had already explored on her previous tour. Additional clothing included T-shirts, designed by Jean Paul Gaultier, and shoes by Miu Miu. The official poster used one of the images from X-STaTIC Pro=CeSS and depicted Madonna in a seventeenth century style dress, crawling on all fours towards the camera. No opening act was used.

Concert synopsis 

The show was divided into five different thematic segments: Marie Antoinette, Military, Circus, Acoustic, and Scottish-Tribal. It began with "The Beast Within"; an ominous reading from the Book of Revelation was done by Madonna while the screens flashed images and footage from X-STaTIC PRO=CeSS. As the video ended, the singer emerged on a rising platform, wearing the Lacroix corset and striking yoga poses to perform "Vogue". "Nobody Knows Me" followed, and saw Madonna energetically dancing by herself on the conveyor belt with some of the song's lyrics appearing onscreen. "Frozen" closed the act; the singer stood alone on the stage and sang the song while the video of an androgynous naked couple wrestling in water played behind her. The Military segment began with the sound of a helicopter in the background as several dancers dressed as soldiers crawled on their bellies and hugged each other. Madonna then appeared on top of a stack of TV sets, dressed in military fatigues and a beret, to perform "American Life". The backdrops showed interspersed footage from the song's original music video and scenes of wounded children, soldiers, and a George W. Bush look-alike lovingly resting his head on the shoulder of a Saddam Hussein look-alike. Halfway through the performance, the V-shaped catwalk was lowered from the ceiling, which allowed the singer and dancers to walk above the audience. Next came "Express Yourself", in which Madonna switched the opening Come on girls! for Come on boys!, and twirled rifles along with the dancers. Rock versions of "Burning Up" and "Material Girl", with the singer playing electric guitar, closed the act.

A remix interlude of "Hollywood" began the Circus act. It featured a breakdancer, a firedancer, a belly dancer, a tap dancer, a skateboarder and animations of the Rider–Waite tarot cards onscreen. The interlude was followed by a cabaret-like performance of "Hanky Panky", with the singer surrounded by female dancers and wearing the circus-inspired corset by Karl Lagerfeld. Next, a slow, Lounge version of "Deeper and Deeper" was performed by Madonna, Donna De Lory, and Siedah Garrett. "Die Another Day" found the singer engaging in a Tango-inspired choreography with dancers, the backdrops showing an old man in his deathbed. Towards the end of the number, several male dancers surround her and strap her into an electric chair on a rising platform, giving way to "Lament". The segment ended with a video interlude set to a remixed "Bedtime Story"; it showed the singer dressed in white, singing in front of a mirror and lying down on a huge scanner. As the video played, three dancers dropped from the ceiling on swings. The Acoustic segment began with "Nothing Fails", sung by Madonna on guitar. Afterwards, she sang "Don't Tell Me", recreating the choreography from the song's video with her dancers. The next song played was "Like a Prayer", which featured Hebrew letters and a choir on the backdrops. During the performance of the combined "Mother and Father" and "Intervention", Madonna once again played guitar as Catholic icons and images of her mother flashed onscreen. "Imagine" closed the segment; footage of war-ravaged children, bombed-out villages and artillery was displayed in the backdrops as Madonna sang.

The final segment, Scottish-Tribal, started with bagpipers marching around the stage in kilts and holding wooden posts. Madonna then appeared onstage wearing a white T-shirt and a kilt to perform the "Into the Hollywood Groove" remix of "Into the Groove" with Lorne Cousin, and rapper Missy Elliott onscreen. She then performed "Papa Don't Preach" decked out in a black T-shirt with the line "Kabbalists Do It Better" ― on certain shows, the T-shirt read "Midwesterners Do It Better", "Italians Do It Better", "Irish Do It Better" and "Brits Do It Better", respectively. Next came "Crazy for You", which the singer dedicated to her fans. The final numbers were "Music" and "Holiday"; the former was set to a slower, hip-hop mix and had a lighted staircase surrounding a DJ, while the latter had the singer and dancers walk on top of the catwalk as confetti fell from the roof. At the end, the screens flashed out the phrase "Re-invent Yourself".

Critical reception 

Critical reviews for the Re-Invention World Tour ranged from positive to mixed. Writing for the New York Post, Elizabeth Smith noted that "unlike 2001's 'Drowned World' tour, which was dark, often hostile, 'Re-invention' returns Madonna to the light. She looks as if she is having a good time [...] [she] presents herself as a vital, joyfully relevant and committed artist [...] giving her fans a taste of the past". Similarly, Mark Guarino from the Daily Herald opined that Re-Invention "joyfully interchanged past with present". Edna Gundersen, writing for USA Today, gave the show four out of four stars; "whereas her last outing had technical strengths but lacked warmth, Re-invention finds Madonna reinvested emotionally [...] opting for more heart than cleavage and more personality than profanity. For Newsdays Glenn Gamboa, the tour showed "a side of Madonna that she hasn't shown very often — the one that has fun, the one that enjoys the roar of the crowd". On his review of the tour's opening night, Rolling Stones Barry Walters opined it was "thematically simpler and more focused" than Madonna's past tours. Highlighting the contrast between "the barbarism of war and the necessity of love" in performances such as "American Life" and "Express Yourself", and praising the artist's "remarkably fun-loving and self-assured" mood throughout the entire night, Walters concluded his review by writing that Madonna had done "the most unexpected thing she could: She came back as a great concert singer". Dave Simpson from The Guardian expressed that, although  "her star is supposedly waning (recent album American Life was her first-ever flop), this audio-visual spectacular is a reminder that there's no one like Madonna". Sean Piccoli from the Sun Sentinel said that "vocally, [Madonna] was in fine, flexible form [...] the choreography, both of dancers and of projected visuals, was energizing and erotic in a playfully grown-up way that would never occur to Britney Spears". Similarly, from the Delaware County Daily Times, Anthony J. Sanfilippo praised the "precise" choreographies, the singer's vocals, costumes, and the "great renditions of her classics". Sanfilippo highlighted the performances of "Like a Prayer" and "Music", concluding that, although Madonna "is a much more tame performer now as a 45 year old mother than she was in her days as a provocative sex symbol", she remains "the greatest entertainer on the planet". Glenn Gamboa said that "[her] latest reinvention may be her best one yet [...] as long as she offers amazing performances like this one, she will have an army of fans backing her up". According to Lucy O'Brien, author of Madonna: Like an Icon, "although musically it had a retro feel, [Re-Invention] showed how Madonna had entered a new phase with her utilization of visual art".

The singer's choice to focus on her old material received praised. The Washington Posts Dave Segal applauded her for working "through whatever issues prevented her from performing her earliest hits". Slants Sal Cinquemani highlighted the performances of "Burning Up", "Material Girl", and "Like a Prayer", adding that the "best thing" that came out of the singer's old songs, is "that she, and we, will be reminded of what she does best: making us forget about the bad times, come together, release the pressure, and have a holiday". From The Buffalo News, Benjamin Siegel noted that "its her '80s hits that keep fans happy, and it looks like she's been paying attention". On her review of the concert in Atlanta, Sonia Murray from The Atlanta Journal-Constitution concluded that "Madonna simply, finally, appealing to her ravenous audience by doing her ever-catchy hits — 'Vogue', 'Express Yourself', 'Material Girl', after 'Into The Groove' and all — was without question the biggest pleaser". Howard Cohen from the Miami Herald opined that the tour "celebrates what that iconic name [Madonna] has meant for 20 years by dusting off many of her greatest hits", while Rochelle Brenner, from The Palm Beach Post, felt that "the old songs took on a new sound that seemed more fitting to the more mature" singer. The San Francisco Chronicles Neva Chonin singled out the performances "in which [Madonna] dispensed with lavish theatrics to play artist", such as "Frozen", "Burning Up", "Material Girl", and "Like a Prayer". Jay Lustig from The Star-Ledger singled out "Burning Up", "Material Girl", "Deeper and Deeper", and "Into the Groove", referring to Re-Invention as the singer's most "dizzying and dazzling" show. Joan Anderman, from the Boston Globe, applauded Madonna's ability to control "her spectacle and her music with equal clarity", and "reinvent her reinventions", citing the performances of "Material Girl", "Express Yourself", and "Into the Groove" as examples. Glenn Gamboa highlighted the "playfulness and innocence" of performances such as "Papa Don't Preach".  The Toronto Suns Jane Stevenson deemed the performance of "American Life" the "biggest production number", but was critical of the third segment, Circus, which she considered the show's "weakest link", that was "saved" by the "wonderfully inventive" performance of "Die Another Day". Tony Clayton-Lea from The Irish Times questioned the inclusion of the singer's "least appealing hits" such as "Die Another Day" and "Hanky Panky", and said of the Slane concert: "Did Madonna rock? No, but she proved why she's the best and most successful female pop star in the world".

In less enthusiast reviews, Sal Cinquemani added that, although it was "much less theatrical" and "more interactive", Re-Invention lacked Drowned World's "fluidity" and wasn't as "emotionally engaging". It was described as "tremendously well-crafted, but also somewhat calculated and soulless" by the Manchester Evening News Paul Taylor. The New York Times Kelefa Sanneh said that the "re-invention" tag had proved "over-ambitious", as Madonna appeared to be stuck "shadowboxing" with her past; "there were times when [Madonna] seemed somehow oppressed by the weight of all her old selves, times when it seemed that she just wanted to wipe the slate clean and start over". Howard Cohen pointed out the singer's "enviable body of pop hits", but felt the tour as a whole didn't "cohere" into a clear theme, comparing it to a "massive ice-cream sundae [...] the ultimate guilty pleasure, but also a load of empty calories". Benjamin Siegel expressed that "new material is not the same as old material recycled [...] There are no more new arrangements in 'The Re-Invention Tour' than there were on her previous tours". On a similar note, Jim DeRogatis from the Chicago Sun-Times criticized the songs' arrangements for being "so bizarre that they played like parodies". He also panned the performances of "Lament" and "Imagine"; the former for proving how "Madonna was poorly suited to perform in musicals like Evita", and the latter for being "anemic, histrionic and soulless". Neva Chonin and Jay Lustig both criticized the performance of "Express Yourself"; Chonin felt Madona "shot herself in the foot" when singing the phrase What you need is a big, strong hand/ To lift you to your higher ground and being elevated on the back of a rifle, while according to Lustig, "theatrics didn't make much sense accompanying a song about personal empowerment". For Chart Attacks Elizabeth Chorney-Booth, "with a name like 'The Re-Invention Tour', one would expect to see Madonna at her absolute finest”; she was also critical of the artist's attitude: "back in the Blonde Ambition  days, her general coldness read as ballsy bitchiness [...] with her new sense of concern for the well-being of the world, her whole onstage persona rings false". The author also pointed out that Madonna didn't look like she was "having fun", and criticized the "hollow" rendition of "Imagine". Writing for Metromix, Greg Kot concluded that, despite "some inspired moments", Re-Invention "is a mess, a hodgepodge of ideas that never quite establishes its tenuous theme".
 
The show's political tones also attained criticism. JimDe Rogatis wrote that, "as a political commentator, [Madonna] made Bart Simpson seem as sophisticated as Noam Chomsky. [And her] attempts to enlighten us about her arcane spiritual belief system didn't fare much better". Peter Bowes from BBC News pointed out that "politically, the concert hit a number of raw nerves with the audience [...] but afterwards, many expressed doubts and disappointment about the anti-war message". Howard Cohen opined that "her anti-war clips trivialized the issue and felt about a year too late", and added that, by getting "whole-hog political", the singer "is no longer Madonna the brave". For Sal Cinquemani, the political imagery felt "completely unrelated" to the songs. Robert Hilburn, from the Los Angeles Times, said that "[Madonna] may feel her political move is trailblazing, but it felt labored [...] reflecting little of the daring and clarity of Sinead O'Connor, Ani DiFranco and Patti Smith", and called for the singer to "bring back the sex". He condemned the "weakly political Re-Invention concert [as] unsexy and uninspiring". Finally, Orla Healy from the New York Post wrote that "Madonna's blond ambition is fading to bland [...] instead of a sexy, flashy, fun-filled show, concertgoers Monday night got an endless dose of political and social commentary". At the 2004 Billboard Touring Awards, Re-Invention received the Top Tour award during the Backstage Pass Conference on November 9; Madonna's tour manager Caresse Henry was awarded Top Manager award. Re-Invention was named Madonna's second best concert tour by both The Advocates Gina Vivinetto and VH1's Christopher Rosa. The Odyssey's Rocco Papa placed it in the ninth position of his ranking of the singer's concert tours.

Commercial reception 

The first tickets for the tour were allotted to the members of Icon, Madonna's official fan club. VIP tickets were sold through the singer's official website, including a $700 "Madonna Platinum Package" that offered seats in an area near the stage and came with a poster, a laminated tag and access to a VIP lounge; some of these packages were then sold through brokers at prices ranging from $1,000 to $1,800. On the same vein, MTV launched the Front and Center with Madonna contest, where fans were able to win "pit tickets" near the stage at certain concerts - Los Angeles, Anaheim, San Jose, Las Vegas, Washington DC and New York City. The singer said she teamed up with the channel for this contest because she wanted "to give an opportunity to my biggest fans to see the show really close, up close and personal". Within the first five days, dates at Los Angeles, Las Vegas, New York, Boston, Chicago, Toronto, Philadelphia, and Miami sold out. In New York, all six dates were completely sold out; Madonna played in front of 88, 625 people and grossed $12,674,925. $23 million were grossed from the first ten concerts. According to China Daily, the 39 concerts of the American leg were attended by an estimated 750,000 people.  Other American grosses included $7.9 million from the concerts at Chicago's United Centre, $7 million from two sellouts at the MGM Grand Garden Arena in Las Vegas, $7 million from three sold-out shows at the Los Angeles Forum, and $6.4 million from the concerts at the Worcester Centrum.

Halfway through, Billboard predicted the tour to be the top-grossing of the year, with a gross of $120 million ($ million in  dollars). Although the Evening Standard reported that "thousands of seats were still available just days before" and tickets "sold far slower than expected", Re-Invention proved to be commercially successful in Europe. 14,000 tickets for the first Manchester date sold out within an hour, with prices going from £75 to £150. Overall in England, $9.8 million were grossed from four sellouts at London's Wembley Arena, $6.3 million from two additional shows at the city's Earls Court and $5.1 million from the two Manchester shows. In Paris, where originally only two dates were scheduled, 15,000 tickets sold out in only 30 minutes, prompting organizers to add two more concerts. More than 40,000 tickets for the singer's first concert in Ireland were sold within 30 minutes of going on sale; due to demand, Ticketmaster doubled their staff, added 500 additional telephone lines to their existing 400 and, for the first time ever, doubled the volume of space on their official website. Tickets for the final Lisbon shows went on sale Friday, July 30, with fan club pre-sale taking place three days earlier; 15,000 tickets sold out on eight hours. Upon completion, it grossed $125 million ($ million in  dollars) and was named 2004's top-grossing tour. Lucy O'Brien noted that, despite being commercially successful, Re-Invention "somehow slipped beneath the mass media radar", and Madonna had to "promote [it] hard, particularly in the US"; she contributed this to "vastly inflated" ticket prices and the lackluster reception towards American Life.

Lip sync allegation and incident

When presenting at the 2004 Q Awards in London, Elton John said he was surprised at Madonna's nomination for Best Live Act as, according to him, she had lip-synched on the Re-Invention Tour; "anyone who lip-synchs in public on stage when you pay $134 to see them should be shot. That's me off her fucking Christmas card list. [...] But do I give a toss? No", expressed John. Madonna's publicist, Liz Rosenberg, denied John's allegations and said that "[Madonna] does not lip-sync nor does she spend her time trashing other artists [...] She sang every note of her Re-Invention tour live and is not ashamed that she was well paid for her hard work [...] Elton John remains on her Christmas card list whether he is nice...or naughty". John later regretted his comments and told Entertainment Weekly that he wanted to apologize to Madonna, referring to the awards show where he made the claims as "a very drunken lunch":
I don't want to escalate it because I like Madonna, [...] She's been to my house for dinner. It was something that was said in the heat of the moment, and probably should not have been said. [...] Would I apologize to her if I saw her? Yeah, because I don't want to hurt any artist's feelings. It was my fault. I instigated the whole thing. But it applies to all those bloody teenage singers. [...] The reaction to it was so hysterical, It was like I said, 'I think all gays should be killed or I think Hitler was right'. I just said someone was lip-synching. I'm not afraid to speak my mind. I'm not going to mellow with age. I get more enraged about things as I get older because you see that these injustices go on.
While setting up the stage for one of the London concerts, a member of the crew was injured after falling from approximately 30 ft. The man suffered injuries to his shoulder and arm and had to be flown to the hospital in an air ambulance. Caresse Henry, the singer's manager, released a statement: "The entire crew, performers and staff, especially Madonna, were very saddened to hear about the accident but are hopeful that he will make a full recovery".

Planned television broadcast, and documentary  

On May 25, 2004, CBS announced a "two-hour, live special" of the tour; according to People magazine, the network offered to pay the singer $10 million to broadcast one of the concerts, but no air date was ever confirmed. On April 22, 2005, it was reported that director Hamish Hamilton and production house The Rude Corp. had sued Madonna, claiming she owed them more than $300,000 in production fees and expenses. The lawsuit alleged that the director and singer had entered into an oral agreement to produce and direct a European television special of the tour; according to Hamilton, it was a "pay-or-play" deal, which meant he would get paid whether not Madonna used his complete services. At her request, the director attended and filmed the tour's rehearsals and various concerts, but was never paid what was promised.

The documentary film which chronicled the tour, I'm Going to Tell You a Secret, was directed by Jonas Åkerlund, who had worked with Madonna in the music videos for "Ray of Light", "Music", and "American Life". Originally titled The Re-Invented Process, in reference to the tour and X-STaTIC Pro=CeSS exhibition, the idea emerged from the singer's urge to show her artistic side and her devotion towards Jewish mysticism Kabbalah; unlike 1991's Madonna: Truth or Dare, which portrayed Hollywood glamour, I'm Going to Tell You a Secret focused on the singer's views on life and spirituality. It premiered on MTV on October 21, 2005. 

Critical reception was mixed; Barry Walters pointed out that it lacked the "dishy delights of [...] Truth or Dare. Instead, a more worldly Madge struggles to become a less sound-bite-reliant, more sincere person"; Stephen M. Deusner from Pitchfork panned it and said that "[Madonna's] life as portrayed in this documentary is cloistered and withdrawn, marked by hours of quiet Kabbalah study but very little self-reflection". On June 20, 2006, it was released in a two-disc format: a live album with 14 songs from the tour and the original rock demo of "I Love New York", and the film's DVD. Critical reception towards the live album was more positive than for the film; AllMusic's Stephen Thomas Erlewine opined that "as Madonna's first live CD, [I'm Going to Tell You a Secret] is strong and entertaining". The live album was nominated for Best Long Form Music Video at the 49th Annual Grammy Awards.

Set list 
Set list, samples and notes adapted per Madonna's official website, the notes and track listing of I'm Going to Tell You a Secret, and additional sources. 

Act 1: Marie Antoinette
"The Beast Within" 
"Vogue"
"Nobody Knows Me"
"Frozen"
Act 2: Military
"American Life" 
"Express Yourself"
"Burning Up" 
 "Material Girl"
Act 3: Circus
"Hollywood" 
"Hanky Panky"
"Deeper and Deeper"
"Die Another Day"
"Lament"
"Bedtime Story" 
Act 4: Acoustic
"Nothing Fails"
"Don't Tell Me" 
"Like a Prayer"
"Mother and Father" 
"Imagine"
Act 5: Scottish-Tribal
"Into the Groove" 
"Papa Don't Preach" 
"Crazy for You"
"Music" 
"Holiday"

Shows

Notes

Personnel 
Adapted from the Re-Invention World Tour 2004 program.

Band 
Madonna –  creator, vocals, guitar
Donna De Lory - vocals
Siedah Garrett - vocals
Stuart Price - musical director, keyboards, guitar
Marcus Brown - keyboards
Michael McKnight - programmer, keyboards
Monte Pittman - guitar
Steve Sidelnyk - drums
Lorne Cousin - bagpipes

Dancers 
Daniel "Cloud" Campos - dancer
Reshma Gajjar - dancer
Mihran Kirakosian - dancer
Paul Kirkland - dancer
Tamara Levinson - dancer
Valerie "Raistalla" Moise - dancer
Dawn Noel Pignuola - dancer
Marilyn Ortiz - dancer
Sean Aries Smith - dancer
Seth Stewart - dancer
Zach Woodlee - dancer
Jason Young - dancer
Sergie Ventura - skater

Choreographers 
Jamie King - choreographer, set designer, show director
Stefanie Roos - assistant director, choreographer
Talauega Brothers - choreographers
Liz Imperio - choreographer
Allen Dekko - drill Specialist
Dreya Weber - aerial choreographer
Armando Orzuzo - Tango choreographer
Daniela Amoruso - Tango choreographer
Karen Dyer - fire specialist
Jason Lewis - consultant
Stephen Kilbride - drum consultant

Wardrobe 
Arianne Phillips - designer
Stella McCartney - designer
Christian Lacroix - designer
Karl Lagerfield for Chanel - designer

Crew 
Caresse Henry - artist management
Shari Goldschmidt - business management
Richard Feldstein - business management
Liz Rosenberg - publicist
Angela Becker - assistant to Madonna
Jordana Steine - ticket coordinator
George Tortarolo - ticket coordinator
Kelli Frazier - ticket coordintor
Angie Edgar- ticket coordintor
Roy Bennett - lighting designer
Peter Aquinde - lighting designer
Sean Spuehler - sound designer
Mirwais Ahmadzaï - music design
Gina Brookee - artist make-up
Gina Brookee - make-up artist
Andy LeCompte - hair stylist
Benny Collins - production manager
Tony Villanueva - wardrobe supervisor
Giovanni Bianco - artwork, logos, tourbook designer
Steven Klein - tourbook photography, video projection 
Craig McDean - photography
Dago Gonzalez - video projection
Chris Cunningham - video projection

References

Bibliography

External links 

Madonna.com > Tours > Re-Invention Tour
Madonna.com > Discography > I'm Going to Tell You a Secret

Madonna concert tours
2004 concert tours